Basanti Devi is an Indian environmentalist. She has been concerned with preserving trees in Uttarakhand. She was awarded the highest award for women in India, the Nari Shakti Puraskar in 2016.

Life
Devi spent her adolescence near Kausani in the Lakshmi Ashram which is a Gandhian ashram for young girls founded by Sarla Behn. She ended up there in 1980 after her husband died as she was a widow at a very young age after being married at the age of twelve. She had been to school before she married but she was only just able to read. At the Ashram she continued to study after reaching the 12th standard, and she became interested in teaching. The wages were poor but her father approved of the work.

She became an environmentalist. She has been concerned with preserving trees in Uttarakhand.

The Kosi River is an important resource in Uttarakhand. The river is responsible for major flooding in Bihar that can affect tens of thousands of hectares of land and a million people. Devi read an article that estimated that the river would cease to exist in a decade if the felling of trees continued at the current rate. She went to speak to local women explaining that this was their forest and their land and asking what they would do once the river had dried up. This began to convince people.

She began a negotiation. It was agreed that the villagers and the timber companies would cease to cut new wood. Villagers agreed that they would only burn old wood. Devi organised community groups and the villagers realised that they needed to conserve their wealth and they would volunteer to fight forest fires. The effects have been slow to see but it is noted that springs that used to dry up in the summer now run all year. Moreover, the forest shows more diversity with more broad leafed trees like oak, rhododendron and myrica esculenta plants appearing.

In March 2016 Devi went to New Delhi where she was awarded the highest award for women in India, the Nari Shakti Puraskar.

References

Indian women environmentalists
Indian environmentalists
1960s births
Living people
Year of birth uncertain
People from Uttarakhand